The Ertan Dam is an arch dam on the Yalong River, a tributary of the Yangtze River in Sichuan Province, in southwest China.

The dam has six hydroelectric generators, each with a generating capacity of 550 MW. The total generating capacity of the facility is 3,300 MW, one of the largest hydroelectric stations in China. The annual production is 17 TWh, and until December 5, 2006, it has produced over 100 TWh of electricity. Construction of the dam started on September 1991 and was completed on December 26, 1999.

The Ertan Dam was designed by the China Hydropower Engineering Consulting Group Survey and Design Institute in Chengdu, and was constructed and is currently operated by Ertan Hydropower Development Company Limited, the owners of the dam. The company is invested by State Development and Investment Company (52% share) and Sichuan Chuantou Energy Limited (48% share).

Design
The dam has four different ways to discharge water downstream. First, the dam's spillway's which contain 7 x floodgates at the crest and two flood tunnels can discharge  and  respectively. The dam also contains 6 x middle outlets and 4 x bottom outlets that can discharge  and  respectively. The dam's power station is located underground along with its transformer room which is in a separate cavern. Additionally, the power station is supported by an underground surge chamber as well.

Main Features

See also 
 List of conventional hydroelectric power stations
 List of power stations in China

References 

Hydroelectric power stations in Sichuan
Dams in China
Dams completed in 1999
Dams on the Yalong River
Arch dams
1999 establishments in China